Harris & Ford is an Austrian DJ team consisting of the two DJs, music producers and songwriters Kevin Kridlo and Patrick Pöhl.

History 
The band was founded in January 2011.

Legendär, Das geht Boom and Tick Tack were the first musical successes of the band. All three songs were able to place themselves in the official Austrian charts. Des Geht Boom stayed in the single charts for eight weeks and also reached number one in the DJ Charts Austria.

While their productions were initially classified as pop dance, their current productions and releases can be classified as hardstyle, psytrance and big room. Harris & Ford have been under a contract with Kontor Records since early 2019.

In May 2019 they reached number 88 in the official German single sales charts with their song Freitag Samstag (feat. Finch Asozial). As a result, various international collaborations emerged. Also in May 2019, they released a single God Save the Rave along with Scooter. The single, Break the Beat followed in September, with the Italian DJ/producer team VINAI. In November 2019, they released an official remix of the Scooter single Devil's Symphony. In December, they released a remix of the track Hardstyle Girl from the project 'Hard But Crazy'. The remix peaked at number one on the Beatport Hard Dance.

In January 2020, they released the song Mutter together with the Dutch rapper Jebroer. The title is based on the Berlin Gassenhaur Mutter, der Mann mit dem Koks ist da from the late 19th century. In March 2020, Fight Back, together with Ummet Ozcan was released through Spinnin' Records. In April 2020, Harris & Ford, along with Norwegian DJ and producer team Da Tweekaza, released a new remix version of the song Moscow by Dschinghis Kahn. The song premiered at the World Cup Dome Winter Edition in Dusseldorf in January 2020. Another remix, He's a Pirate, was released in April 2020. In May 2020, the song Spotlight was released together with Dutch DJ and producer Sander van Doorn on Spinnin' Records. In May 2020, the single True Friendship was released.

Discography

Singles 

 2011: Your show
 2012: I feel like it
 2012: Legendary
 2013: That Goes Boom (Shag Ragga) (vs. Gordon & Doyle feat. Lisah)
 2014: Tick Tock (feat. Lisah)
 2015: Great! (feat. Trackshittaz )
 2015: We Need Mood (feat. Vanny)
 2016: Eurotrip (with Anna Chiara)
 2016: If Not Now, When (vs. Powerkryner )
 2017: Born to Party (with Marry )
 2017: Forever and Now (Club Mix) (with Julia Buchler )
 2017: Up & Down (The Fit Program)
 2017: 96 Hours Awake (feat. Jöli)
 2018: Forever young
 2018: Live is Life (feat. Ena)
 2018: A day of infinity
 2018: Hard, Style & Folk Music (feat. Addnfahrer; AT:)
 2019: We are the party (with Isi Glück )
 2019: Drop Me Amadeus
 2019: Friday Saturday (with Finch ; AT:)
 2019: God Save the Rave (with Scooter ; AT:)
 2019: Break the Beat (with Vinai )
 2020: Mother (with Jebroer )
 2020: Fight Back (with Ummet Ozcan )
 2020: Moscow (with Da Tweekaz )
 2020: Spotlight (with Sander van Doorn )
 2020: True Friendship
 2020: Neighbors (with Finch)
 2020: Rocketship (with Da Hool)
 2020: Addicted To The Bass (with Brennan Heart )
 2020: My Way (with Mike Candys )
 2020: Higher Space (with Jerome )
 2021: The Master (with Jebroer )
 2021: Bye Bye (with Neptunica)
 2021: Lost in you (with Maxim Schunk )
 2021: Coco Jambo (with HBz & Thovi)
 2021: Running (with Klaas )
 2021: Everlasting (with Nooma)
 2021: Million Dreams (with Ummet Ozcan )
 2021: Circus (with Amber Van Day )
 2021: Madhouse (with Outsiders)
 2021: I Wouldn't Know (with Molow )
 2021: Bassman (with Blasterjaxx )
 2021: Jeanny (with Ian Storm & SilkandStones)
 2021: Checkmate (with Maxim Schuck & Hard But Crazy)
 2021: Dreams (with Axmo feat. Sarah de Waaren)
 2021: Never Let Me Go (with Timmy Trumpet & Cascada )
 2021: Neon Lights (with Lizot )
 2021: Your Mama (with Glass Bead Game )
 2021: Survivors
 2022: The Sound (with Robert Falcon feat. JUSTN X)
 2022: Alive (with Madugo)
 2022: Numb (with DJ Gollum )
 2022: Never Alone (with Hard But Crazy)
 2022: Hollywood (with Faustix feat. PollyAnna)
 2022: Amsterdam (with 2 Angels & Charlie)
 2022: Psycho (with Bassjackers feat. Rebecca Helena)
 2022: Turn Back Time
 2022: Raindrop (with Marnik feat. Shibui)
 2022: Make The World Rave Again (with Finch )
 2022: Come With Me (with W&W & Special D. )
 2022: Died In Your Arms (Reloaded) (with Sound Rush)
 2022: Halo (with Prezioso feat. Shibui)
 2022: “Weekend Party” (with ItaloBrothers)
 2022: I’ve got hungry eyes (with Mark Star & Chris Thor)

Remixes 

 2011: C-Nattix - Love
 2011: Sunset Project & Tomtrax - Nessaiah
 2012: Mike Indigo- Bam Baram
 2012: Royal XTC feat. Molti- Hello
 2013: DualXess & Nico Provenzano feat. Charlee - Ladies Night
 2013: Gordon & Doyle - Raise Your Memory
 2013: Funky Control - Freaky Boys
 2013: DJ East Curve feat. Big Daddi, Kane & Enzo - Ti amo 2k13
 2013: Club Raiders - Get Away
 2013: Flava & Stevenson feat. Cesca Lara - Love a Paris
 2013: Peter Sax- Pool Party
 2013: Action in the ear - it doesn't matter
 2013: Tomtrax— Mono 2 Stereo
 2013: Seaside Clubbers - Don't Forget
 2014: Trackshittaz - Awesome!
 2014: Pressure Unit feat. Young Sixx - Let's Go Wild
 2016: Andreas Gabalier – Hulapalu
 2016: Vanessa Mai - I die for you
 2016: Kerstin Ott - Little Rocket
 2017: Lorenz Buffalo – Johnny Däpp
 2017: Nockalm Quintet – In the night
 2017: Helene Fischer – only with you
 2017: Marco Wagner & Dave Brown – Hey Bro
 2017: Peter Wackel – I'm selling my body
 2017: Peter Power & Powerkryner - Left Right - Jump!
 2018: Isi Glück - Life is a party
 2018: Almklausi & Specktakel - Mama Laudaaa
 2018: Andreas Gabalier – Hello
 2018: The doctors - cry for love
 2019: Miranda – Vamos ala Playa
 2019: Scooter - Devil's Symphony
 2019: Hard But Crazy - Hardstyle Girl
 2020: Scotty - He's a Pirate
 2021: Captain X- Wellerman
 2021: Maxim Schunk & Noisetime – Perfect Match
 2021: Emi Flemming – Don't Worry (Get Yourself A Hobby)
 2021: Jebroer - Blood Mary
 2021: Electric Callboy - Pump It
 2021: Yves V & CORSAK feat. Leony - Where Do You Think You Are Going
 2021: NoooN & Kati Breuer - Nuts are healthy
 2022: Alexander Eder – 7 hours
 2022: Julian Sommer - Tight in the plane
 2022: 2 Angels & Charlie – Goethe
 2022: Tream – BMW 3 Series
 2022: The Zipfelbuben – Olivia
 2022: Nathan Evans - Drunken Sailor
 2022: Nena - 99 Luftballons

External links 

 Harris & Ford website

References 

Dance bands